The Fearsome Foursome was the dominating defensive line of the Los Angeles Rams of the 1960s and 1970s.  Before them, the term had occasionally been applied to other defensive lines in the National Football League.

New York Giants
In the 1957 season the New York Daily News, a major New York city tabloid, ran an article and sketches of the New York Giants' line consisting of ends Andy Robustelli and Jim Katcavage, and tackles Rosey Grier and Dick Modzelewski and a headline that read "A Fearsome Foursome."

Detroit Lions
Announcer Van Patrick applied the nickname "Fearsome Foursome" to the Lions front four as early as 1960, when the Lion defensive line consisted of ends Bill Glass and Darris McCord, and tackles Alex Karras and Roger Brown.

The term was also used for the Detroit Lions defensive line after Sam Williams replaced Glass, who was traded to the Browns after the 1961 season.

San Diego Chargers
The nickname "Fearsome Foursome" was also used to describe the American Football League's San Diego Chargers' defensive front four, including starters DE Ron Nery, DT Bill Hudson, DT Ernie Ladd, and DE Earl Faison.  The Chargers moved to San Diego in 1961, and Faison made overall AFL Rookie of the Year, a rare feat for a defensive player.  Alternate members of the group included DE Bob Petrich, DT George Gross, and DE-DT Henry Schmidt.  At the time Gross and Ladd were two of the largest and strongest men in professional football. The Chargers' Foursome helped them reach the first two American Football League Championship games and five altogether, winning the AFL Championship in 1963 with a 51-10 thumping of the Boston Patriots.

Los Angeles Rams

Still later, Rosey Grier was acquired from the New York Giants in 1963 to join Lamar Lundy, Merlin Olsen and Deacon Jones as the Los Angeles Rams starting defensive line. They also became known as the Fearsome Foursome, and the greater publicity garnered by the NFL leads many to assume they were the originals. Dick Butkus called them "the most dominant line in football history." They gained fame as the Rams went from a perennial under .500 team to an NFL powerhouse under coach George Allen.
Roger Brown replaced Grier in 1967, and Diron Talbert replaced Brown in 1970. Also in 1970 Coy Bacon replaced Lamar Lundy.

The line was ultimately broken up when George Allen became coach of the Washington Redskins in 1971; Talbert and Jones left in 1972, with Talbert following Allen to the Redskins, and Jones going to the Chargers for two years before eventually reuniting with Allen himself on the Redskins in 1974. Bacon left in 1973.  After missing the playoffs from 1970 to 1972, the Rams won seven straight division titles from 1973 to 1979, which was an NFL record until 2016 when broken by the New England Patriots. Those Rams teams were led in part by a reconstituted Fearsome Foursome.

This line consisted of ends Jack Youngblood and Fred Dryer, and tackles Olsen and Larry Brooks. Youngblood and Olsen are NFL Hall of Famers while Brooks made the Pro Bowl 5 times. Dryer, acquired from the Giants in 1972, also made the Pro Bowl once, and set an NFL record with 2 safeties in one game vs. the Packers. Olsen, who played with his brother Phil Olsen for 4 seasons from 1971 to 1974, retired after a 15-year career at the end of the 1976 season. He was replaced by Mike Fanning, who with Youngblood, Dryer and Brooks started in Super Bowl XIV following the 1979 season. 

The line was documented in NFL Network's A Football Life, and was narrated by Josh Charles.

See also

 List of American Football League players

References

External links
 NFL Films about the LA Rams Fearsome Foursome

Nicknamed groups of American football players
Los Angeles Rams
San Diego Chargers